Enes Mešanović  (born 22 August 1975) is a retired Bosnian-Herzegovinian international footballer, who played for Sloboda Tuzla in Bosnia and Herzegovina, Dinamo Zagreb and Osijek in Croatia and had a brief spell with Erzurumspor in the Turkish Super Lig.
He is currently manager of youth football school Sport Klub Bambi.

Club career
Mešanović won the Croatian Championship with Dinamo Zagreb during the 2002–03 season.

International career
Mešanović made his debut for Bosnia and Herzegovina in a June 2001 Merdeka Tournament match against Slovakia and has earned a total of 5 caps, scoring 1 goal. Two of his games at the Merdeka were unofficial, though. His final international was a July 2001 friendly match against Iran.

International goals

References

External links
 

1975 births
Living people
Sportspeople from Tuzla
Association football forwards
Bosnia and Herzegovina footballers
Bosnia and Herzegovina international footballers
FK Sloboda Tuzla players
Erzurumspor footballers
NK Brotnjo players
GNK Dinamo Zagreb players
NK Osijek players
NK Maribor players
FK Sarajevo players
Bargh Shiraz players
NK Croatia Sesvete players
Premier League of Bosnia and Herzegovina players
Süper Lig players
Croatian Football League players
Slovenian PrvaLiga players
Persian Gulf Pro League players
First Football League (Croatia) players
Bosnia and Herzegovina expatriate footballers
Expatriate footballers in Turkey
Bosnia and Herzegovina expatriate sportspeople in Turkey
Expatriate footballers in Croatia
Bosnia and Herzegovina expatriate sportspeople in Croatia
Expatriate footballers in Slovenia
Bosnia and Herzegovina expatriate sportspeople in Slovenia
Expatriate footballers in Iran
Bosnia and Herzegovina expatriate sportspeople in Iran
FK Sloboda Tuzla managers
Premier League of Bosnia and Herzegovina managers